En Directo is a live EP by the spanish rock band Héroes Del Silencio, released in 1989 after the "El Mar No Cesa" tour. This is their first live album and these songs would also be included in other albums like the Special Edition of El Mar No Cesa, Rarezas, and Canciones '84-'96.

Track listing 
"Mar adentro"
"No más lágrimas"
"La visión de vuestras almas"
"El estanque"
"Olvidado"

External links
 Héroes Del Silencio official Site 

Héroes del Silencio albums
1989 EPs
Rock en Español EPs
EMI Records EPs
Spanish-language EPs